An election to Sligo County Council took place on 20 June 1985 as part of that year's Irish local elections. 25 councillors were elected from five electoral divisions by PR-STV voting for a six-year term of office.

Results by party

Results by Electoral Area

Ballymote

Dromore

Drumcliffe

Sligo

Tubbercurry

External links
Official website
Irishelectionliterature

1985 Irish local elections
1985